The following outline is provided as an overview of and topical guide to World War I:

World War I – major war centred in Europe that began on 28 July 1914 and lasted until 11 November 1918. It involved all the world's great powers, which were assembled in two opposing alliances: the Allies (centred on the Triple Entente of Britain, France and Russia) and the Central Powers (originally centred on the Triple Alliance of Germany, Austria-Hungary and Italy). More than 70 million military personnel, including 60 million Europeans, were mobilised in one of the largest wars in history. More than 9 million combatants were killed, largely because of great technological advances in firepower without corresponding advances in mobility. It was the sixth deadliest conflict in world history, subsequently paving the way for various political changes such as revolutions in the nations involved.

Nature of World War I 
World War I can be described as all of the following:
 War
 Total war
 World war

World War I was further characterized by the following types of warfare:
 Aerial warfare
 Armoured warfare
 Asymmetric warfare (in some cases)
 Attrition warfare
 Chemical warfare
 Early modern warfare or modern warfare
 Ground warfare
 Naval warfare
 Submarine warfare
 Intensified submarine warfare
 Unrestricted submarine warfare
 Trench warfare

Causes of World War I

Long term influences leading to World War I 

Cultural and strategic factors:
 Imperialism
 Militarism
 Nationalism
 Cult of the offensive – Considerations of the advantage of striking first.
 Preventive war

Destabilizing of the European balance of power:
 Balkanization
 Tensions between Austria and Serbia
 May Overthrow
 Pig War
 Bosnian crisis
 Tensions between Russia and Austria
 Campaign in and annexation of Bosnia by Austria-Hungary
 First Balkan War
 Second Balkan War
 Tensions between France and Germany
 Franco-Prussian War (1870–1871) – brought the establishment of a powerful and dynamic Germany, causing what was seen as a displacement or unbalancing of power
 Tensions between the United Kingdom and Germany
 Naval arms race between the United Kingdom and the German Empire
 Tensions between Italy and Austria
 Annexation of Bosnia by Austria-Hungary

Web of alliances:
 Diplomatic history of World War I
 The Central Powers
 Dual Alliance (Germany and Austria-Hungary)
 Triple Alliance (1882) (Germany, Austria-Hungary and Italy)
 The Allies
 Franco-Russian Alliance (1894)
 Entente Cordiale between France and the British
 Anglo-Russian Entente of 1907
 Triple Entente
 Treaty of London, 1839, about the neutrality of Belgium
 German Imperial War Council of 8 December 1912

Short term influences leading to World War I 
 Assassination of Archduke Franz Ferdinand of Austria
 July Crisis
 French entry into World War I
 German entry into World War I
 Japanese entry into World War I

Participants in World War I 

World War I was fought between the Allies and the Central Powers.

The Central Powers (Triple Alliance (1882))

The Allies (Triple Entente)

Main Allied countries 
  French Third Republic (including colonial forces)
  (until March 1917)
  Russian Republic (March 1917 - November 1917)
  (November 1917 - March 1918)
 
  United Kingdom (including colonial forces)
 
  (from May 1915) (including colonial forces)
  (including colonial forces)
  United States of America (after April 1917)

Other military allies 
Other states that had military participation:

 
 
  Portuguese Republic (March 1916 and after) (including Portuguese colonial forces)
  (August 1916 – May 1918, November 1918)
  (November 1916 for the Government of National Defence; June 1917 for the whole country)
  Albania
  Brazil (October 1917 and after)
  Armenia (May 1918 and after)
  Czechoslovakia – See Czechoslovak Legions
  Finland (October 1918 and after)
  (soldiers served under the British Indian Army)
  Kingdom of Siam
  (June 1915 and after)

Nominal Allies 
States that declared war, but had no military involvement:

 
  (April 1917 and after)
  (August 1917 and after)
  (May 1918 and after)
  (April 1917 and after)
  (December 1917 and after)
  (April 1918 and after)
  (August 1917 and after)
  (July 1918 and after)
  (July 1918 and after)
  (May 1918 and after)
  (December 1917 and after)
  (October 1917 and after)
  (October 1917 and after)

Conduct of the war 

 Allied declarations of war
 British propaganda during World War I
 Convoys in World War I
 German occupation of Luxembourg in World War I
 Roosevelt's World War I volunteers
 Strategic bombing during World War I
 German strategic bombing during World War I
 World War I conscription in Australia
 World War I naval arms race
 United States Navy operations during World War I
 Military engagements of World War I

World War I theatres, fronts, and campaign 
 South Arabia during World War I
 Western Front (World War I)
 Eastern Front (World War I)
 West Africa Campaign (World War I)
 East African Campaign (World War I)
 Italian Campaign (World War I)
 Sinai and Palestine Campaign
 Caucasus Campaign
 Mesopotamian Campaign
 Gallipoli Campaign
 Attacks on North America during World War I

Naval campaigns of World War I 
 Battle of the Atlantic (1914-1918)
 Adriatic Campaign of World War I
 Naval operations in the Dardanelles Campaign
 Blockade of Germany

World War I by country

Central Powers 
 Austria-Hungary during World War I
 Hungary in World War I
 Poland during World War I
 Bulgaria during World War I
 Germany during World War I
 German East Africa during World War I
 Poland during World War I
 Ottoman Empire during World War I
 Aliyah and yishuv during World War I
 Armenia in World War I 
 Western Armenia
 Armenians in the Ottoman Empire
 Armenian notables deported from Constantinople in 1915
 Armenian genocide
 See also Armenian genocide recognition
 Armenian resistance (1914–1918)
 Administration for Western Armenia
 Armenian irregular units
 Armenian volunteer units
 Armenian casualties during World War I
Seyfo
Greek genocide
Deportations of Kurds (1916–1934)
 Prosecution of Ottoman war criminals

Allies

Main allies 
 Bulgaria during World War I
 Serbia during World War I
 France during World War I
 Summary
 French foreign policy and the outbreak of the First World War
 French Army in World War I
 French villages destroyed in the First World War
 Russia during World War I – food shortages in the major urban centres, and poor morale due to lost battles and heavy losses sustained, brought about civil unrest which led to the February Revolution, the abdication of the Tsar, and the end of the Russian Empire.
 Russian Revolution (1917) – end of Imperial Russia
 February Revolution –
 Russian Provisional Government –
 October Revolution – beginning of the Soviet Union
 Poland during World War I
 Finland during World War I
 Grand Duchy of Finland
 Finnish Declaration of Independence
 Ukraine during World War I
 British Empire during World War I
 United Kingdom during World War I
 Australia during World War I
 Australian women during World War I
 India in World War I
 Canada during World War I
 Newfoundland during World War I
 New Zealand in World War I
 South Africa in World War I
 South African Overseas Expeditionary Force
 Southern Rhodesia in World War I
 Hong Kong during World War I
 Italy in World War I
 United States in World War I
 Puerto Ricans in World War I

Other allies 
 Albania during World War I
 Brazil during World War I
 Czechoslovaks in World War I
 Czechoslovak Legions
 Greece during World War I
 Japan during World War I
 Montenegro during World War I
 Nepal during World War I
 Portugal during World War I
 Romania during World War I
 Siam during World War I
 San Marino during World War I

Nominal allies 
 Andorra during World War I
 Bolivia during World War I
 China during World War I
 Costa Rica during World War I
 Cuba during World War I
 Ecuador during World War I
 Guatemala during World War I
 Liberia during World War I
 Haiti during World War I
 Honduras during World War I
 Panama during World War I
 Peru during World War I
 Uruguay during World War I

World War I impact on neutral countries 
 Norway in World War I
 Espionage in Norway during World War I
 Mexico in World War I
 Ireland and World War I
 Montserrat in World War I
 Spain in World War I
 Switzerland during the World Wars
 Vietnam during World War I
 Afghanistan – received a German diplomatic mission trying to convince it to act against the British in India
 Argentina – Ally to US by treaty (see ABC countries for more information)
 Bhutan
 Chile – Ally to US by treaty (see ABC countries for more information)
 Colombia
 Denmark – Traded with both sides.
 El Salvador
 Ethiopian Empire – received a German diplomatic mission trying to convince it to act against the British in Africa
 Liechtenstein – Had a customs and monetary union with Austria-Hungary.
 Luxembourg – Never declared war on the Central Powers despite being invaded and occupied by Germany.
 Mongolia - 
 Mexico- Declined an alliance with Germany (see Zimmermann Telegram). An ally to the United States by treaty (see ABC countries).
 Netherlands – An ally of the United Kingdom by treaty. Traded with both sides.
 Norway – Gave naval assistance to the United Kingdom.
 Paraguay
 Persia – Occupied by British and Russian troops.
 Spain – Also treaty bound ally to the United Kingdom.
 Sweden during World War I – Financially supported Germany.
 Switzerland – Switzerland did declare a "state of siege".
 Venezuela – Supplied the Allies with oil.

People in World War I

Leaders in World War I 
 Allied leaders of World War I
 Leaders of the Central Powers of World War I

Military forces of World War I 
 :Category:World War I flying aces
List of World War I aces from Canada
 List of World War I flying aces
 List of British armies in World War I
 List of British corps in World War I
 List of British divisions in World War I
 List of Indian divisions in World War I
  Austro-Hungarian Armed Forces 
  German Army (German Empire) 
 Royal Serbian Army

Technology during World War I

Equipment of World War I

Vehicles of World War I 
 List of military aircraft of Central Powers in WWI
 List of military aircraft of Entente Powers in WWI
 List of aircraft of the Royal Flying Corps
 List of aircraft of the Royal Naval Air Service
 List of military aircraft of Germany#Before 1919

Weapons of World War I 
British Army uniform and equipment in World War I

Common military awards

Russian Empire 

 Cross of St. George
 Order of St. George
 Order of Saint Vladimir
 Order of Saint Anna

United States 
 Medal of Honor
 Silver Star
 Bronze Star
 Distinguished Flying Cross
 Air Medal
 World War I Victory Medal
 Asiatic-Pacific Campaign Medal
 European-African-Middle Eastern Campaign Medal
 American Campaign Medal

British Empire 
 Victoria Cross
 Air Force Cross, from June 1918
 Order of the Bath
 Order of the British Empire
 Distinguished Flying Cross
 1914 Star
 Pacific Star

France and Belgium 
 Croix de Guerre

Imperial Germany 
 Iron Cross
 Pour le Mérite also known as the "Blue Max"
 House Order of Hohenzollern
 Order of the Red Eagle

Kingdom of Serbia 

 Order of Karađorđe's Star

Austria-Hungary 

 Military Order of Maria Theresa
 Military Merit Cross

The end of World War I 
 Armistice of Salonica (September 29, 1918) - surrender of Bulgaria
 Armistice of Mudros (October 30, 1918) – surrender of the Ottoman Empire
 Armistice of Villa Giusti (November 3, 1918) – surrender of Austria-Hungary
 Armistice with Germany (November 11, 1918) – surrender of Germany

Aftermath of World War I 

 World War I reparations
 Dissolution of the Austro-Hungarian Empire into several successor states:
 Czechoslovakia
 Yugoslavia
 First Republic of Austria
 Hungarian Democratic Republic
 Second Polish Republic
 Cession by Austria-Hungary of Transylvania and Bukovina to Romania.
 Cession by Austria-Hungary of the southern half of the County of Tyrol and Trieste to Italy
 Establishment of the First Republic of Armenia
 Further Balkanization
 World War II
 World War I was one of the main causes of World War II

World War I-related media 
 List of books about World War I
 List of World War I films
 World War I in literature
 World War I in popular culture

Non-fiction 
 Germany's Aims in the First World War

Fiction 
 Fiction based on World War I

World War I remembered 
 World War I reenactment
 WWI memorials
 World War I Memorial (Berwick, Pennsylvania)
 World War I Memorial (Atlantic City, New Jersey)
 World War I Memorial (East Providence, Rhode Island)
 WWI veterans

See also 

 Opposition to World War I
 Outline of war
 Outline of World War II

Notes

References

Sources
  (translated from the German)

Further reading
 Bond, Brian.  "The First World War" in C. L. Mowat, ed. The New Cambridge Modern History: Vol. XII: The Shifting Balance of World Forces 1898-1945 (2nd ed. 1968) online pp 171–208.

External links 

The War to End All Wars on BBC
WWI Service Questionnaires at Gettysburg College
A multimedia history of World War I
The Heritage of the Great War, Netherlands
Collection of World War I Color Photographs
The Commonwealth War Graves Commission
Royal Engineers Museum Royal Engineers and the First World War
World War I : Soldiers Remembered Presented by the Washington State Library and Washington State Archives
The World War I Document Archive Wiki

Outline
World War I
World War I